Philautus cornutus is a species of frog in the family Rhacophoridae.
It is endemic to Indonesia.

Its natural habitats are subtropical or tropical moist lowland forests and subtropical or tropical moist montane forests.
It is threatened by habitat loss.

References

Amphibians of Indonesia
cornutus
Amphibians described in 1920
Taxonomy articles created by Polbot